The Sri Lanka Sinha Regiment (SLSR) (Sinhala: ශ්‍රී ලංකා සිංහ රෙජිමේන්තුව Śrī Laṃkā Sinha Rejimēnthuva) is an infantry regiment of the Sri Lanka Army; it is the second oldest infantry regiment in the army. It is made up of seven regular battalions, five volunteer battalions and a headquarters battalion at the Ambepussa Camp.

History
Sri Lanka Sinha Regiment was the first rifle regiment of the Sri Lanka Army and was formed on 1 October 1956 at the Imperial camp at Diyatalawa. The first battalion primarily consisted of 60 officers and other ranks from the Ceylon Light Infantry with Lt Col R. D. Jayathilaka MBE as the first commanding officer.

The D company of the volunteer Ceylon Light Infantry was transformed into the Rajarata Rifles under the leadership of Lt Col (later Colonel) S.D. Ratwatte, and went on to become the 2nd Volunteer Battalion of the Sinha Regiment on 1 October 1956. On 1 October 1969 the 3rd Volunteer Battalion of the Sinha Regiment was formed at Hill School in Nuwara Eliya.

The regiment first saw action during the 1971 Insurrection and underwent an expansion with escalation of the Sri Lankan Civil War. With the expansion of the regiment the Regimental Centre of Sri Lanka Sinha Regiment was established on 9 May 1988 at Diyatalawa at the same location where the 1st Battalion of the Sinha Regiment was raised. Brig D Wijesingha was the first regimental commander. Later, on 21 October 1989 the Regimental Centre was relocated to Ambepussa Camp where the 1st Battalion of the Sinha Regiment was at that time. The regiment distinguished itself greatly during the Sri Lankan Civil War including having three Parama Weera Vibhushanaya and one Weerodara Vibhushanaya recipients. In 1990 the elements of the 6th Battalion successfully held the old Dutch fort of Jaffna for two months while surrounded and under siege until it was relieved by the subsequent Operation Thrividha Balaya. July 1991 the 6th Battalion garrisoned Elephant Pass base when it came under siege with the LTTE launching a massive attack on the base. The battalion held out what was termed the battle of all battles until it was relieved following Operation Balavegaya 18 days later.

On 3 May 2005 a contingent of troops from the regiment took part in the United Nations Stabilization Mission in Haiti.

The Sri Lanka Sinha Regiment is the only regiment in the history of the Sri Lanka Army to produce an army commander holding the rank of a full general (four star) and later a Field Marshal as indicated in the notable members area.

As a rifle regiment it marches in 180 steps a minute during parade when it is involved, together with the regimental band - the only Sri Lanka Army regiment to do so. 

Commander Security Force – East, Major General GRRP Jayawardena RWP RSP ndu assumed duties as the 16th Colonel of the Regiment of the Sri Lanka Sinha Regiment on 23 May 2022. Later, Brig MPNA Muthumala USP psc assumed duties as the 24th Commandant of the Regimental Centre Sri Lanka Sinha Regiment on 15 June 2022 during a charm ceremony held at the Regimental Centre, Ambepussa.

Units

Recipients of the Parama Weera Vibhushanaya
 Captain Saliya Upul Aladeniya 
 Corporal Gamini Kularatne 
 Lance-Corporal A. M. B. H. G. Abeyrathnebanda 
 Sergeant Anura 
 Lance Corporal Rajapakshe

Notable members
Field Marshal Sarath Fonseka, RWP, RSP, VSV, USP, rcds,PSC  - Former commanding officer of the Sri Lankan Army
General Anuruddha Ratwatte - Former Cabinet Minister and Deputy Minister of Defence
Major General A.R. Udugama, MBE - Former Commander of the Ceylon Army
Major General MAM Dias  RWP, RSP, VSV, USP  ,PSC  -Former General Officer Commanding, 54 Division in Mannar
Major General E. G. Thevanayagam - former Chief of Staff, Sri Lanka Army
Major General H.S Hapuarachchi, - Former Chief of Staff, Sri Lanka Army.
Major General Gemunu Kulatunge, RSP, USP  - Former Deputy Chief of Staff, Sri Lanka Army.
Major General Kumudu Perera RWP RSP VSV USP ndu - Former Deputy chief of staff, Sri Lanka Army
Major General Laksiri Waduge RWP RSP VSV USP ndu - Former Commander Security Forces Headquarters – Central
Major General Susantha Mendis  -Former Brigade Commander, 512 Brigade.
Major General D.W. Hapuarachchi - Commanding Officer - 1st Bn SLSR, Founder Commanding Officer Sri Lanka National Guard
Brigadier T.S.B. Sally - Commanding Officer - 1st Bn SLSR, Chief of Staff, Sri Lanka Army.
Brigadier S.B. Miyanadeniya - Commanding Officer - 1st Bn SLSR, Director Training SL Army
Major D.M.L.B.Dissanayake RSP - Commanding Officer - 15th Bn SLSR
Staff Sergeant Pradeep Sanjaya, - Bronze medalist 400m London Paralympics 2012, 4th Battalion Sri Lanka Sinha Regiment.

Order of precedence

See also
 Sri Lanka Army

External links and sources

References

Sinha Regiment
Military units and formations established in 1956
1956 establishments in Ceylon